Solute carrier family 2 (facilitated glucose transporter), member 14 is a protein that in humans is encoded by the SLC2A14 gene.

Members of the glucose transporter (GLUT) family, including SLC2A14, are highly conserved integral membrane proteins that transport hexoses such as glucose and fructose into all mammalian cells. GLUTs show tissue and cell-type specific expression.

References

Further reading 
 
 
 

Solute carrier family